Foreign Soil is a collection of short fiction by Maxine Beneba Clarke published in 2014 by Hachette. It won the 2013 Victorian Premier's Unpublished Manuscript Award, the 2015 ABIA for Best Literary Fiction, the 2015 Indie Award for Best Debut Fiction, and was shortlisted for the 2015 Stella Prize.

References 

2014 short story collections
Refugees and displaced people in fiction
Hachette (publisher) books